Roberto Soares Anghinetti (or simply Robertinho) (born June 13, 1988) is  Brazilian football player. He is a winger who plays for Estrela do Norte.

Career statistics

Last edit: March 3, 2013

External links
 FC Dinamo Tbilisi player profile  
 

1988 births
Living people
Brazilian footballers
Brazilian expatriate footballers
Association football forwards
América Futebol Clube (MG) players
Expatriate footballers in Georgia (country)
FC Dinamo Tbilisi players
Shamakhi FK players
Brazilian expatriate sportspeople in Azerbaijan
Brazilian expatriate sportspeople in Georgia (country)
Estrela do Norte Futebol Clube players
Association football midfielders
Footballers from Belo Horizonte